Eufalconimorphae is a proposed clade of birds, consisting of passerines, parrots, falcons, caracaras, and forest falcons (but not other raptors). It has whole-genome DNA support. Eufalconimorphae birds are characterized by their strong and hooked beaks, sharp talons, and powerful wings. They have excellent eyesight, which allows them to spot their prey from great distances. The Eufalconimorphae is noted to produce aerodynamic force during the upstroke of flight to help create a vertical flight pattern.

See below cladogram showing Eufalconimorphae's relationship within Australaves:

References

External links
 Tetrapod Zoology, after Suh et al. (2011).

Neognathae